Forrest L. Richardson (born April 12, 1959) is an American golf course architect and member of the American Society of Golf Course Architects (ASGCA).

Professional career 

Forrest Richardson began his career under the guidance of Arthur Jack Snyder (1917–2005), a golf architect who changed his career from golf course superintendent to designer in the late 1950s. Snyder served as Grounds Superintendent of Oakmont Country Club in Pittsburgh in the early 1950s. In 1988 Forrest Richardson founded Golf Group Ltd. (now known as Forrest Richardson & Associates. Forrest Richardson & Associates is based in Phoenix, Arizona with an office also located in Southern California. Forrest Richardson has designed, remodeled and restored more than 20 golf courses and has been involved in the planning of more than 80 golf projects in and outside the US. Forrest Richardson has served as a member of the Board of Governors of the American Society of Golf Course Architects (ASGCA) and joined the Executive Committee in 2017 as Secretary, a position that eventually leads to the presidency (2020).

Other accomplishments and career highlights

Prior to becoming a golf course architect, Richardson had a brief career in market research and then in television art direction.  He was Art Director of KPHO Television in Phoenix, Arizona from 1980 to 1981. In 1981 he founded Richardson or Richardson (dba Richardson Design) with his wife, Valerie. The firm, based in Phoenix, Arizona, was a design consultancy serving clients including Hilton Hotels, Disney Development, News Corporation and Coca-Cola. The firm specialized in brand development, packaging and environmental graphics. In 1986 the couple decided to shift away from branding and marketing to allow Forrest to pursue his work as a golf course architect. Richardson has written five books on the subject of golf course architecture and is a contributor to some magazines and publications on golf management and golf development.

Books authored

Representative golf course projects

References

External links
 American Society of Golf Course Architects 
ASGCA Leadership 
Golf Group Ltd.

1959 births
Living people
Golf course architects
Phoenix College alumni